The Chasers is a 1965 Swedish drama film directed by Yngve Gamlin. It was entered into the 16th Berlin International Film Festival where it won the Silver Bear Extraordinary Jury Prize.

Cast
 Halvar Björk - Kalle Olofsson
 Leif Hedberg - Olle Stensson
 Lars Passgård - Desperado
 Curt Broberg - Commissioner
 Curt Ericson - Old Hunter
 Olle Nordgren - Young Hunter

References

External links

1965 films
1960s Swedish-language films
1965 drama films
Swedish black-and-white films
Films directed by Yngve Gamlin
Silver Bear Grand Jury Prize winners
1960s Swedish films